Klass is a Germanic surname. Notable people
with the surname include:

 Alisha Klass (born 1972), American pornographic actress
 Christa Klaß / Christa Klass (born 1951), German politician
 Craig Klass (born 1965), former water polo player
 David Klass (born 1960), American screenplay writer and children's author
 Edward Klass (born 1965), American water polo player
 Eugene Klass (1919-2009), known as American actor Gene Barry
 John Klass (born 1975), triple-platinum award-winning singer/producer/songwriter/radio presenter
 Günter Klass (1936-1967), German race driver
 Myleene Klass (born 1978), British musician, former member of the UK pop group Hear'Say
 Perri Klass (born 1958), pediatrician and writer
 Philip Klass (1920-2010), American science fiction writer under the name William Tenn
 Philip J. Klass (1919–2005), American UFO researcher
 Salomon Klass (1907–1985), a Finnish soldier
 Sholom Klass (1916–2000), Rabbi and editor of The Jewish Press

See also
 7277 Klass (1983 RM2), main-belt asteroid discovered 1983
 Klass (album), an album by Bad Manners
 Klass, Ilmar Raag's movie about school violence
 Class (disambiguation)
 Clazz (disambiguation)